Kiangsu-Chekiang College (Kwai Chung) (KCCKC) is a secondary school in Kwai Chung, Hong Kong.

External links

 Kiangsu-Chekiang College (Kwai Chung)

Kwai Chung
Secondary schools in Hong Kong